Lea Castle is a ruined Grade II listed Neo Gothic mock castle mansion near Wolverley, England.

History
Lea Castle was built by Edward Knight in 1762. John Brown bought the house in 1823. By 1848 it was owned by the Brown-Westhead family.

The house was auctioned in 1933 but by 1939 it was dilapidated. Lea Castle was demolished in 1945. It was designated as a Scheduled Monument on June 15, 2003. Today, only the north lodges and gateway survive, dating to the 19th and 20th centuries.

References 

Grade II listed buildings in Worcestershire
Buildings and structures in Worcestershire
Gothic Revival architecture in Worcestershire
Buildings and structures completed in 1762
Buildings and structures demolished in 1945
Mock castles in England